Alkalibacillus flavidus is a Gram-positive, rod-shaped and motile bacterium from the genus Alkalibacillus which has been isolated from a marine solar saltern from the Yellow Sea.

References

Bacillaceae
Bacteria described in 2010